Johan M  Bäckö (born 29 January 1982) is a retired Swedish professional ice hockey player.

Playing career 

Bäckö started his career in Nittorps IK where he played until signing for Gislaveds SK in the Swedish Allsvenskan league for the 2001/2002 season. 
After 2 seasons with Gislaveds SK Bäckö signed a contract with Morzine/Avoriaz in the French second league. Bäckö backstopped the team and lead them to winning the league the very first year with the club. The title led the club to advancing to the Ligue Magnus where he played a total of 3 seasons, all with Morzine/Avoriaz.
After minor stints with New Mexico Scorpions in the Central Hockey League and Tyringe SOSS in the Swedish 1st division Bäckö signed with Les Francais Volants de Paris in 2008. He played 5 seasons with the Parisian club before retiring in 2013.

Clubs represented 

2001-02  Gislaveds SK  	
2002-03	 Gislaveds SK
2003-04	 Morzine-Avoriaz
2004-05	 Morzine-Avoriaz
2005-06	 Morzine-Avoriaz
2006-07	 Tyringe SoSS
2006-07	 New Mexico Scorpions	 	 	 	  
2007-08	 Morzine-Avoriaz
2008-09	 Français Volants Paris	 	
 2009-10	 Français Volants Paris	 	
 2010-11	 Français Volants Paris	 	
 2011-12	 Français Volants Paris	 	
 2012-13	 Français Volants Paris

References

1982 births
Swedish ice hockey players
Living people